Marquette Catholic Schools was a Roman Catholic school with its administrative offices in West Point, Iowa.

Circa 1997 its campuses were: Marquette Primary School in Houghton, Marquette Intermediate School in St. Paul, and Marquette Senior High School in West Point.

In 2005 it merged with Aquinas Schools of Fort Madison to form Holy Trinity Catholic Schools. The Marquette building was chosen for junior high school while the Aquinas building was chosen for senior high school. The merger was due to increasing costs and the declining population of Lee County, the latter of which meant reduced numbers of pupils.

References

External links
 
 

Catholic secondary schools in Iowa
Catholic high schools in the United States
Catholic middle schools in the United States
Catholic elementary schools in the United States
Roman Catholic Diocese of Davenport
Schools in Lee County, Iowa
2005 disestablishments in Iowa
Educational institutions disestablished in 2005
Private middle schools in Iowa
Private elementary schools in Iowa